Active fuel length is the length of the fuel material in a fuel element. This is the Total rod length minus the plenum length and end plugs.

The fuel element or assembly is arranged in an array of cells or bundles. Each bundle consists of multiple fuel rods or pins. Each fuel rod is composed of several cylindrical fuel pellets of enriched uranium, typically as UO2 inserted into zirconium-alloy tubes. Each reactor core can be loaded with multiple bundles of these reactor bundles.

See also
 Nuclear fuel
 Nuclear reactor
 Nuclear reactor technology
 Nuclear fuel cycle
 Uranium market
 Reprocessed uranium
 Nuclear physics
 Nuclear reactor physics

References

External links
 Nuclear glossary

Nuclear power plant components
Nuclear reactors
Pressure vessels